The Karabakh Liberation Organization (KLO) was an Azerbaijani organization created in Baku, Azerbaijan on January 28, 2000 with objective of "liberation of Nagorno-Karabakh". Led by Doctor of History, docent Akif Naghi, KLO represents cultural figures of Azerbaijan, former military soldiers, refugees and internally displaced persons (IDPs).

References

Nagorno-Karabakh conflict
Organizations based in Baku
2000 establishments in Azerbaijan